This is a list of Eastern Orthodox bishops and archbishops. See also Eastern Orthodox Church organization and Patriarch.

Archbishops in the autocephalous churches

Ecumenical Patriarchate of Constantinople
Archbishop of Constantinople (also the Patriarch)
Archbishop of America of the Greek Orthodox Archdiocese of America
Archbishop of Australia of the Greek Orthodox Archdiocese of Australia
Archbishop of Crete of the Church of Crete
Archbishop of Toronto and Eastern Canada of the Ukrainian Orthodox Church of Canada
Archbishop of Edmonton and Western Canada of the Ukrainian Orthodox Church of Canada
Archbishop of Italy and Malta
Archbishop of Thyateira and Great Britain

Greek Orthodox Church of Alexandria

Greek Orthodox Church of Antioch
Metropolitan of Antioch and Damascus (also the Patriarch)
Metropolitan of Akkar
Metropolitan of Aleppo (Beroea) and Alexandretta
Metropolitan of Beirut
Metropolitan of Bosra, Hauran and Jabal al-Arab
Metropolitan of Byblos and Batroun
Metropolitan of Homs (Emesa)
Metropolitan of Hama (Epiphania) and Exarchate of North Syria
Metropolitan of Latakia (Laodicea ad Mare) and Exarchate of Theodorias
Metropolitan of Zahleh and Baalbek (Heliopolis)
Metropolitan of Tripoli and Koura
Metropolitan of Tyre and Sidon
Metropolitan of Baghdad, Kuwait and Dependencies
Metropolitan of Australia, New Zealand and the Philippines
Metropolitan of France, Western and Southern Europe
Metropolitan of Germany and Central Europe
Metropolitan of the British Isles and Ireland
Metropolitan of North America (based in Englewood, New Jersey)

Greek Orthodox Church of Jerusalem
Archbishop of Gerasa 
Archbishop of Tiberias 
Archbishop of Abila 
Archbishop of Joppa 
Archbishop of Constantina 
Archbishop of Mount Thabor
Archbishop of Jordan 
Archbishop of Sebastia 
Archbishop of Askalon 
Archbishop of Diocaesarea 
Archbishop of Mount Sinai and Raithu of the Church of Sinai

Russian Orthodox Church

Georgian Orthodox Church
 Archbishop of Mtskheta-Tbilisi (also the Patriarch)
 Archbishop of Tsageri and Lentekhi
 Archbishop of Bodbe
 Archbishop of Stepantsminda and Khevi
 Archbishop of Rustavi and Marneuli
 Archbishop of Dmanisi, Agarak-Tashiri, Great Britain and Ireland

Serbian Orthodox Church
 Archbishop of Peć (also the Patriarch)
Archbishop of Ohrid of the Orthodox Ohrid Archbishopric

Romanian Orthodox Church
 Archbishop of Bucharest (also the Patriarch)
Archbishop of Alba Iulia
Archbishop of Cluj
Archbishop of Suceava
Archbishop of Tomis (Constanţa)

Bulgarian Orthodox Church

Church of Cyprus
Archbishop of Nea Justiniana and All Cyprus

Church of Greece
Archbishop of Athens and all Greece

Albanian Orthodox Church
Archbishop of Tirana, Durrës and all Albania

Polish Orthodox Church

Orthodox Church of the Czech Lands and Slovakia
Archbishop of Prague and Czech lands
Archbishop of Prešov and Slovakia

Orthodox Church in America

Orthodox Church of Ukraine

Autonomous Churches

Finnish Orthodox Church
Archbishop of Helsinki and all Finland

Metropolitans in the Eastern Orthodox Communion
Metropolitan of Hong Kong and Southeast Asia
Metropolitan of Kiev (OCU)
Metropolitan of Korea
Metropolitan of New Zealand
Metropolitan of North America and Canada (OCA)
Metropolitanate of Singapore and South Asia
Metropolitan of Tallinn and All Estonia (EOCoMP)
Metropolitan of Tallinn and All Estonia (EAOC)
Metropolitans of Warsaw and Bielsk (POC)

Archbishops and Metropolitans of Eastern Orthodox Autocephalous Churches out of their jurisdiction
Archbishops of North America
Archbishops of Tokyo

Eastern Orthodox Bishops
Bishops of Bialystok and Gdansk
Bishops of Eagle River
Bishops of Lódz and Poznan
Bishops of Los Angeles and the West
Bishops of Lublin and Chelm
Bishops of Maardu
Bishops of Miami and the Southeast
Bishops of Narva
Bishops of New England
Bishops of New York and Washington D.C.
Bishops of Oakland and the East
Bishops of Ottawa, Eastern Canada and Upstate New York
Bishops of Pärnu and Saaremaa
Bishops of Przemysl and Nowy Sacz
Bishops of San Francisco and Los Angeles
Bishops of Tartu
Bishops of Toledo and the Midwest
Bishops of Wichita and Mid-America
Bishops of Wroclaw and Szczecin

See also
List of Catholic dioceses (structured view)
List of Catholic dioceses (alphabetical)
List of Roman Catholic archdioceses
List of Roman Catholic dioceses
List of Anglican dioceses and archdioceses
List of bishops in the Church of England
List of current patriarchs
List of Methodist Bishops
Lists of office-holders